Hu Nai-yuan (born 1961 at Tainan, Taiwan) is a Taiwanese violinist. He was the first prize winner in the 1985 Queen Elisabeth Music Competition.

Life and career
Hu Nai-yuan started to study the violin at the age of 5. By the age of 8, he performed as soloist with the National Youth Orchestra of Taiwan. He came to the United States in 1972 to continue his studies, first with Broadus Erle and Joseph Silverstein. He studied with Josef Gingold at Indiana University and also served as Gingold's assistant after graduation. He is considered one of Mr. Gingold's best students.

Since winning the First Prize of the prestigious Queen Elisabeth Competition in 1985, Hu Nai-Yuan has appeared on many of the world's stages, including the Concertgebouw in Amsterdam, Avery Fisher Hall in New York City and major venues in London, Paris, Brussels, Munich, and other cities in Europe, North and South Americas and Asia. In praise of his playing, BBC Music Magazine wrote, “Taiwanese violinist Nai-Yuan Hu is an awesomely capable performer whose technical facility, musical intelligence and unfaltering verve place him among the higher echelons of today’s string virtuosi.”

He plays the Ex-Hubay Stradivarius.

He was featured as a violinist in the 2001 film Kate & Leopold starring Meg Ryan and Hugh Jackman.

Awards
 1985: First Prize in Queen Elisabeth Competition

Recordings
Nai-Yuan has recorded the Goldmark Violin Concerto and Bruch Violin Concerto #2.

References

Artist Profile | Chamber Music International

External links
Nai-Yuan Hu at Allmusic

Living people
1961 births
Musicians from Tainan
Taiwanese violinists
Prize-winners of the Queen Elisabeth Competition
American musicians of Taiwanese descent
21st-century violinists